Olivier Trastour (born 30 December 1971) is a French former racing cyclist. He rode in the 2001 Tour de France.

Major results
1997
 1st Stage 3 Vuelta a Navarra
1999
 1st Stage 2 Vuelta Ciclista de Chile

References

External links
 

1971 births
Living people
French male cyclists
People from Cagnes-sur-Mer
Sportspeople from Alpes-Maritimes
Cyclists from Provence-Alpes-Côte d'Azur